Julia Banaś, also spelled Julia Banas, is a Polish fashion model.

Career
Banaś was discovered at age 17, and debuted as a Miu Miu and Fendi exclusive in 2016. She’s also walked for DKNY, Moschino, Altuzarra, Fila, Marni, Hermès, and L’Oréal.

In 2015, she won Glamour Poland’s Woman of the Year award.

Banaś has been on the cover of Vogue Portugal, The Edit, Elle Poland, and Marie Claire Italy. She has appeared in H&M magazine, Vogue Italia, W, Allure, Love, Numéro, The Daily Telegraph, Vogue Paris, V, The Sunday Times, Vogue Mexico, Vogue Australia, Vogue China, Vogue Japan, and Vogue Poland.

Banaś has done ads for Gucci, Sephora, Aldo, Zara, Marc Jacobs, Oysho, Emporio Armani, and Stella McCartney.

References 

1997 births
Living people
Polish female models
People from Częstochowa
The Society Management models
Elite Model Management models